The Rainbow Tower is a  tower located at the Rainbow Plaza Canada–US border station of the Rainbow Bridge in Niagara Falls, Ontario, Canada. Construction on the tower was completed in 1947. The tower, part of the Canadian plaza of the bridge, was designed by Canadian architect William Lyon Somerville.

The Rainbow Carillon

The Rainbow Tower houses a carillon—a musical instrument consisting of a baton keyboard that controls a series of bells. The Rainbow Carillon is sounded three times a day, 365 days a year. It features 55 bells with a total weight of over 43 tons. The instrument is controlled via a series of 55 oak batons and 30 foot pedals.

The bell castings for the Rainbow Carillon were begun in 1941 by John Taylor Bellfounders of Loughborough, England, but interrupted by the onset of World War II. Work on the instrument resumed in 1945 and was completed by 1947.

When the tower was built it contained a small apartment for the resident carillonneur. The bells were silenced for renovations from 1998 to 2001 and by 2002, the Niagara Falls Bridge Commission had replaced the resident carillonneur with a fully automated system. The instrument can still be played manually, but is mostly automated to allow for frequent playing.

Carillonneurs

Several Canadians and at least two Americans (Kleinschmidt and Werblow) have served as carillonneurs:

 Robert B. Kleinschmidt (1910-1959) 1948-1959

 John Leland Richardson (1906-1969) 1960-1969

 Gordon Frederick Slater (1950-) 1972-1975

 Robert Donnell (1910-1986) 1975-1976

 June Somerville 1976-1992

 Gloria Werblow 1986-1998

In film
The Rainbow Tower was featured in the 1953 Marilyn Monroe thriller Niagara. Scenes were filmed outside the base of the tower, combined with sound stage footage. The long "tracking" shot of Marilyn Monroe was completed in one shot, unique in "Three-Strip" Technicolor.

See also
 List of carillons

References

Sources

Towers completed in 1947
Buildings and structures in Niagara Falls, Ontario
Carillons
Bell towers in Canada
Towers in Ontario